Brentford Ait  is a long  uninhabited ait (river island) in the River Thames, without buildings, on the Tideway near Brentford in London, England.

Ownership and size
It is administered by the London Borough of Richmond upon Thames and Port of London Authority. The ait has a gap in the middle known as Hog Hole which is apparent at lower high tides, dividing the ait into "upper" and "lower" sections which are awash with water at mean high water springs. 

The ait was also known as Makenshaw, Mattenshaw or Twigg Ait. For reasons likely connected with ownership the ancient parish of Kew in Surrey included Brentford Ait in its history; the London Borough of Hounslow governs neighbouring Lot's Ait separated only by thick, shifting mud at low tide from Brentford whereas channels beside the dual ait are dredged.
 In the 18th century the ait was inhabited; a main building was a latter-day notorious pub, the Swan or Three Swans; its trade was ended in 1796. On the Brentford bank, the Swan Steps lead down to the river at the east end of the long and narrow park, Waterman's Park. From these the crossing to the pub ran. 

The ait has borne large trees since the 1920s to screen Brentford's gasworks (since removed) from the view of Kew Gardens. The ait is covered by willows and alder and is a bird sanctuary with a significant heronry.

See also
Islands in the River Thames

References

Bibliography

Brentford, London
Geography of the London Borough of Hounslow
Islands of the River Thames
Islands of London
Uninhabited islands of England